Shkapovo is a rural locality (a village) in Mikhaylovsky Selsoviet, Bizhbulyaksky District, Bashkortostan, Russia. The population was 4 as of 2010. There are 4 streets.

Geography 
Shkapovo is located 15 km northwest of Bizhbulyak (the district's administrative centre) by road. Milisonovka is the nearest rural locality.

References 

Rural localities in Bizhbulyaksky District